Scrobipalpa meyricki is a moth in the family Gelechiidae. It was described by Povolný in 1971. It is found in Algeria and Tunisia.

There are brownish to ash-grey dark-tipped scales on the forewings. The hindwings are dirty whitish.

References

Scrobipalpa
Moths described in 1971